Yntymak is a pro-Japarov political party in Kyrgyzstan.

According to the preliminary results of the 2021 parliamentary election, the party came in third with 10 seats.

References

Political parties in Kyrgyzstan
Political parties established in 2011